The Lords of Bucquoy were members of the feudal nobility of the Netherlands. Now part of France, the dominium of Bucquoy was inherited by many important families. The House of Longueval moved to Bohemia in circa 1620.

History 
Bushoy, as it was called in old Dutch, was amongst the oldest lands in Artois. It was divided into two parts. Its territory was held by several major noble houses, including the House of Châtillon. Jeanne de Chatillon, daughter of Hughes and the last heiress of her line, married John I, Count of La Marche, who was lord of Bucqoy.
In 1688, the dominium became a county at the request of Charles II.

House of Chatillon 

Hugues de Chatillon
Jean de Chatillon;married to John I, Count of La Marche
Louis, Count of Vendôme
John VIII, Count of Vendôme
Jacques of Bourbon, Governor of Valois
Charles de Bourbon, Lord of Bucqouy

House of Sterck-Glimes

Gerald Sterck, Lord of Bucquoy;married to Jossina van den Daele, Lady of Stabroeck.
Anna Sterck, Lady of Bucoy; married to Ferry de Glimes, Baron of Grimberghen

House of Glymes-Berghes

Ferry of Glimes, Baron of Grimberghen
Gerard de Berghes, Lord of Bucquoy and Stabroeck;Married to Anne de Halmale''

House of Longueval

Counts of Bucquoy

Maximilien de Longueval, 1st Count of Bucquoy
Charles Bonaventure de Longueval, 2nd Count of Bucquoy, the general of Habsburg army, moved from 1619 to 1621 to Bohemia, died in a battle by Nové Zámky in Slovakia. 
Charles Albert de Longueval, 3rd Count of Bucquoy

References 

Flemish nobility
 
Bu